Rajat Arora (born 23 July 1975) is an independent screenwriter who has worked in the Indian film and television industry for over two decades.

His speciality lies in punch-packed dialogues and he has delivered a spate of hit movies like Once Upon a Time in Mumbaai (2010), The Dirty Picture (2011), Kick (2014), Gabbar Is Back (2015) and Taxi No. 9211 (2006).

His versatile writing pans most genres including action, comedy-drama, superhero stories, romantic musicals as well as biopics.

Once Upon a Time in Mumbaai (2010) is a critically acclaimed gangster movie. This blockbuster gained a cult status, especially for its powerful, motivational and insightful dialogs that have become street-speak for Indian audience.

Another cultish movie The Dirty Picture (2011) is loosely based on the life and times of a South Indian actor. Rajat Aroraa's script for The Dirty Picture riled up a feminist discourse and shook the conservatives of Indian society.

"The naughty dialogues (Rajat Aroraa) of the film which add immense flavour to the proceedings. It's a no-holds-barred screenplay which rightly refuses to treat sex as a three letter word. The Dirty Picture is definitely not only your film for the week, but is a seminal work that will be studied in feminist discourses."

Baadshaho (2017), a period action-thriller was directed by Milan Luthria and starred Hindi Film superstar Ajay Devgn. The movie did well and the dialogues received audience appreciation.

AZHAR (2016), a biographical sports drama based on life of the most controversial Indian Cricket Captain was produced by Sony Pictures and Balaji Telefilms.

Hindi dubbed version of the International blockbuster Captain Marvel (2019) was scripted by Rajat Aroraa. It retained the core essence and emotions of the original and was yet relatable for Hindi speaking audience. As Aroraa said in a statement, "It is a very significant film being the first Marvel female superhero film and I am thrilled to be a part of the project!".

Rajat's next is Thalaivi - a trilingual biopic based on life and times of J. Jayalalithaa, late politician and film actress who served as the Chief Minister of Tamil Nadu, with Kangana Ranaut playing the lead.

Also in production is the Hindi remake of Telugu super hit film RX 100  to mark the debut of Ahan Shetty, son of veteran actor Suneil Shetty.

Early life and education
Born and brought up in New Delhi, Rajat is an alumnus of Asian Academy of Film & Television as well as a B.Com. Hon. Graduate from Delhi University. A South Delhi boy who migrated to Mumbai in the late '90s, Rajat at 21 was raring to "struggle" and achieve his childhood dream. Luck struck when within a few months he found an opportunity to write for TV series CID and Aahat.

Rajat started as a dialogue writer but soon started contributing towards the story and screenplay for Aahat and C.I.D.

Career
Rajat Arora burst into Bollywood scene as a dialogue writer for the hit movie Bluffmaster (2005). Directed by Rohan Sippy, the film was lauded for its dialogues. Veteran film critic Taran Adarsh. found the dialogues 'fantastic' while other critics called the dialogues 'quotable'. The dialogues were declared the highlight of the movie.

Taxi No. 9211 (2006), one of the Highest Grossing film that year, was written by Rajat and directed by Milan Luthria. The slice-of-life, high on drama and action story turned out to be critics' favourite and they described it as 'impeccable'.

Rajat teamed up with Luthria again for Once Upon a Time in Mumbaai (2010). He muscled the single-screens' melodrama into multiplexes through '70s dialogue-baazi. The movie won many accolades from critics and viewers alike for its direction and its powerful and engaging screenplay.

Bollywood Trade Analyst Komal Nahta wrote that 'Rajat Aroraa has penned an interesting story and padded it up with a highly engrossing screenplay that doesn't let the viewer lose grip for even a moment. Aroraa's dialogues, of course, are absolutely fantastic, many of them clapworthy.'

Rajat's next, The Dirty Picture (2011) saw him turn lyricist for the chartbuster 'Ooh La La Tu Hai Meri Fantasy'. The movie was an instant Blockbuster Hit and it won over both the masses and the critics.

After the tremendous success of Once Upon a Time in Mumbaai and The Dirty Picture the writer-director duo Rajat Aroraa and Milan Luthria delivered yet another blockbuster Once Upon ay Time in Mumbai Dobaara! (2013). Once again the dialogues of the movie were said to be applause worthy and were the cherry on the cake.

Highest grosser of 2014, Kick (2014) starring Salman Khan, brought Rajat's prowess of script and screenplay writing into the limelight once again. Released on Eid, Kick received an overwhelming response at the box office. The total worldwide collection crossed INR 3 billion and was the highest grosser of 2014.

Gabbar Is Back (2015) was yet another hit delivered by Rajat Aroraa, where Akshay Kumar played a grief stricken vigilante, committed to end corruption in India. This action-drama film was appreciated for its dialogues which swung between powerful and quirky.

Filmography

Television 
Rajat Arora has written over 100+ episodes of CID and Aahat. Story, screenplay and dialogue writer for prime time Indian television lead him to Bollywood films.

Films 
Rajat has been writing dialogues, screenplay, story and lyrics as an Independent Writer for over 20 years now.

Awards and accolades 
In 2004, Rajat was awarded 'Best Teleplay Writer' by the Indian Television Academy. He even has an entry as the co-writer for C.I.D in the Guinness Book of World Records for 'Longest Single Shot Episode'.

Rajat has also been awarded the Hindi Seva Samman for his literary contribution towards Hindi Language.

References

External links
 
 
 

Indian male screenwriters
1976 births
Living people
Indian television writers
Delhi University alumni
Indian lyricists
Screenwriters from Delhi
Male television writers